Wynne School District 9 is a school district in Cross County, Arkansas, headquartered in Wynne. It serves Wynne and Parkin.

The district operates Wynne Primary School, Wynne Intermediate School, Wynne Junior High School, and Wynne Senior High School.

On September 7, 2005, the former Parkin School District merged into the Wynne School District.

References

External links
 
 
School districts in Arkansas
Education in Cross County, Arkansas